Wraithborne is an action role-playing game developed by Alpha Dog Games and published by Crescent Moon Games for iOS in 2012, for Ouya in 2013, and for Android in 2014.

Development
The game was developed in six months.

Reception

The iOS version received "average" reviews according to the review aggregation website Metacritic.

References

External links
 

2012 video games
Action role-playing video games
Android (operating system) games
Fantasy video games
IOS games
Ouya games
Single-player video games
Video games about ghosts
Video games about magic
Video games about zombies
Video games developed in Canada
Crescent Moon Games games